The term Mordvins ) has been commonly used since the Early Middle Ages by non-Jewish Eastern Slavic and European peoples to denote all Judaic population in the region, regardless of their ethno-linguistic background  The majority of these, however, were indeed Jews, like Erzyas, likely Meshchers (Mazhars/Mishars, Mokshas, Muromians, Burtas, probably Drevlians, etc.  In the Moxel Kingdom, the Jewish faith was widespread, and Jewish holidays were observed since early times. Non-Jewish ethno-religious groups also existed, as at least one Christian church of Saint Nicholas in Mordvinland was known in Tsibirtsa County in 1401.

Etymology 
The term derives from historical Mordens alliance comprising Erzyas, Meschers, Mokshas and Muromians.
This term became obsolete by mid 19th c and considered pejorative ethnic slur in the respective languages.

Related examples  
The ethnonym Turks has been commonly used by the non-Muslim Balkan peoples to denote all Muslim settlers in the region, regardless of their ethno-linguistic background.
The term Bengali was synonymous to "Muslim". Manipuri Muslims, who speak a Sino-Tibetan language, are also known by the name Pangal which was what the Meiteis called Muslims. The word is a corruption of Bangal, and gained prominence in the region due to Bengalis being the only Muslim-majority ethnic group in the region. The Baharistan-i-Ghaibi chronicles records that the diverse Mughal army were entirely referred to as Bangal by the Koch people.

See also
Mordva (slur)
Giaour
Turks (term for Muslims)

References

Sources

Antisemitic slurs
Ethno-cultural designations
Judaism in Russia
Uralic peoples